Evan Roth (born 1978) is an American artist who applies a hacker philosophy to an art practice that visualizes transient moments in public space, online and in popular culture.

Biography

Evan Roth received a degree in architecture from University of Maryland and a MFA from the Communication, Design and Technology school at Parsons The New School for Design, where he graduated as class valedictorian. During his time at Parsons, he developed several projects, including Graffiti Taxonomy, Typographic Illustration, Explicit Content Only and Graffiti Analysis, his thesis project. Roth was named one of the ten most interesting recent graduates of 2006.

After graduating Roth worked at the Eyebeam OpenLab, an open source creative technology lab for the public domain as a Research and Development Fellow from 2005–2006 and a Senior Fellow from 2006-2007. Roth's work with graffiti, open source technology and public space led to him forming the Graffiti Research Lab ("GRL") with James Powderly in 2005.  GRL projects include LED throwies and L.A.S.E.R. Tag.  In 2007, Roth co-founded the Free Art and Technology Lab (F.A.T. Lab), an Internet-based art-and-technology collective dedicated to the intersection of open-source hacking and popular culture. He has worked under the pseudonym fi5e.

Roth and Ben Engebreth were awarded a 2007 Rhizome Commission for White Glove Tracking, which was presented at the Contemporary New Museum in New York City.  Roth was again awarded a Rhizome Commission in 2008 for his project "T.S.A. Communications".

Several of Roth's work are in the permanent collection of the Museum of Modern Art. Roth currently lives in Berlin with his wife.

In 2012, he was awarded a Smithsonian Cooper-Hewitt National Design Award.

Exhibitions 
Selected exhibitions, screenings and performances include:
 2004, The Cracow Film Festival, Cracow, Poland
 2005, Typsonic, Ingolstadt, Germany
 2005, Tokyo Type Directors Club Tokyo, Tokyo, Japan (Curated by John Maeda)
 2006, Ars Electronica, Goodbye Privacy, Linz, Austria
 2007, Eyebeam, Open City, New York City, New York
 2007, Ars Electronica, Second City, Linz, Austria
 2007, IEEE, Infovis Art Show, Sacramento, California
 2007, Microwave Festival, Luminous Echo, Hong Kong
 2007, 2nd Digital Arts Festival, OpenPlay, Taipei City, Taiwan
 2007, Sundance Film Festival, New Frontiers, Park City, Utah
 2008, Museum of Modern Art, Design and the Elastic Mind, New York City, New York
 2008, Videotage, Secondlife, Hong Kong
 2008, Elizabeth Foundation for the Arts, Beyond a Memorable Fancy, New York City, New York
 2008, Netherlands Media Art Institute, Speaking Out Loud, Amsterdam, Netherlands
 2008, Tate Modern, Street Art, London, UK
 2008,  Thailand Creative & Design Center, Perishable Beauty Exhibition, Bangkok, Thailand
 2008, Museum of Modern Art, Rough Cut: Design Takes a Sharp Edge, New York City, New York
 2009, Filmwinter, Festival For Expanded Media, Stuttgart, Germany
 2009, AVAILABLE ONLINE FOR FREE, Solo exhibition, Vienna, Austria
 2009, Kurzfilmtage, 55th International Short Film Festival, Oberhausen, Germany
 2009, Fondation Cartier, Born In The Streets - Graffiti, Paris, France
 2010, British Design Museum, Brit. Insurance Design of the Year 2010, London, UK
 2011, Kitsch Digital: Tres décadas de interferencias en la web, Can Felipa. Barcelona, España. Curator Helena Acosta

References

External links

 

1978 births
American graffiti artists
American conceptual artists
Living people
Artists from New York (state)
Digital art
Hacker culture
Parsons School of Design alumni
University of Maryland, College Park alumni
National Design Award winners
People from Okemos, Michigan